Ryszard Zbigniew Stanibuła  was born in 1950 Rachanie and was a member of the Polish People's Party.  He earned a Veterinary Degree from the Agricultural Academy in Lublin in the year 1976. He later studied Agricultural Law at University Carnio in France.
 
Stanibula began serving as a congressman in 1993.  He has served since then, taking a small break during 1997 and 1998.  He is notable as the very active having received the most votes in any election since the death of Ryszard Bondyra.  For example, during his Third term, Ryszard Stanibula spoke 250 times for his region. In the Second, Third and Fourth Sejm RP Stanibula represented the Lublin District.  He is also a member of the National Fire Department Union.

1950 births
Living people
Polish veterinarians
Members of the Polish Sejm 1991–1993
Members of the Polish Sejm 1997–2001
Members of the Polish Sejm 2001–2005
Recipients of the Silver Cross of Merit (Poland)
Recipients of the Gold Cross of Merit (Poland)